Zulfiya Khasanovna Zabirova (born 19 December 1973) is a Russian professional cycle racer who won the gold medal in the time trial event in the 1996 Olympics and later, in 2002, won the World Time Trial Championship.

Biography
Zulfiya was born in Tashkent, Uzbekistan on 19 December 1973. She is an ethnic Uzbek. In 1993 two years after the breakup of the Soviet Union she emigrated to Russia and lived in Rostov-on-Don. As the main reason for her emigration she cited that the Islamist leadership of the newly independent Uzbekistan is hostile to the women sports and the rights of women in general. In 1996 she became famous after winning the Olympic gold medal in Atlanta.

In 2005, she obtained the citizenship of Kazakhstan and announced her intention to compete as a member of the Kazakhstan team. As the reason for her decision she cited the better conditions for training and her desire to be closer to her native Uzbekistan (Kazakhstan has a reputation to be much more secular and democratic than Uzbekistan) as well as her family circumstances. According to the Russian Newspaper Komsomolskaya Pravda, Zabirova's main place of residence and training is Lugano, Switzerland (as of 2005).

Major results

1994
3rd UCI Junior Track Cycling World Championships (Individual pursuit)

1995
2nd National Road Championships, Time Trial

1996
1st  Olympic Games Time Trial
National Road Championships
1st  Time Trial
2nd Road Race
1st GP Kanton Zurich
Tour Cycliste Feminin
Two Stage wins
3rd Tour du Finistère

1997
1st  National Road Championships, Road Race
1st Overall Étoile Vosgienne
One stage win
1st Overall Trois Jours de Vendée
One stage win
1st Chrono des Herbiers
1st Tour du Finistère
Tour Cycliste Feminin
Two Stage wins
2nd UCI Road World Championships Time Trial
2nd Chrono Champenois
2nd GP des Nations
2nd Thrift Drug Classic
3rd Overall Women's Challenge
Two stage wins
3rd Overall Gracia–Orlová

1998
1st GP Suisse Féminin
1st GP des Nations 
1st Josef Voegeli Memorial
Tour Cycliste Feminin
One stage win
2nd UCI Road World Championships, Time Trial
4th Overall Thuringen Rundfahrt der Frauen

1999
1st Overall Tour de Suisse Feminin
1st One stage win
3rd Overall Women's Challenge
One stage win 
5th Overall Giro d'Italia Femminile
1st Stages 4, 7, & 9

2000
1st  National Road Championships, Time Trial
1st Overall Tour de Suisse Feminin
One stage win
5th Overall Grande Boucle 
1st Stage 9 & 13
7th Olympic Games Road Race

2002
1st  UCI Road World Championships, Time Trial
1st Overall Thuringen Rundfahrt der Frauen
One stage win
1st GP Carnevale d'Europa
1st Chrono Champenois-Trophee Europeen
Grande Boucle
Two stage wins
1st Stage 4 Giro della Toscana
7th Overall Giro d'Italia Femminile
9th GP Suisse

2003
1st Overall Vuelta Castilla y Leon
1st Stages 2 & 3
1st Primavera Rosa
Grande Boucle
Two stage wins
3rd UCI Road World Championships, Time Trial
4th Overall Trophée d'Or Féminin

2004
3rd UCI Road World Championships, Time Trial
1st Tour of Flanders
1st Primavera Rosa
1st Overall Thuringen Rundfahrt der Frauen
1st Stage 5
8th Olympic Games, Time Trial
10th Overall Giro d'Italia Femminile
1st Stage 5

2005
National Road Championships
1st  Time Trial
1st  Road Race
1st Prologue Giro di San Marino
1st Stage 4 Giro d'Italia Femminile
6th UCI Road World Championships, Time Trial

2006
National Road Championships
1st  Time Trial
1st  Road Race
1st Overall Trophée d'Or Féminin
1st Stage 1
1st Tour de Berne
2nd Chrono des Nations

2007
National Road Championships
1st  Time Trial
1st  Road Race
2nd Tour of Flanders

2008
National Road Championships
1st  Time Trial
1st  Road Race
1st Stages 3 & 3 Tour de l'Aude Cycliste Féminin
10th Olympic Games, Road race

References

External links
 Official website
Cycling Website profile
Article in Komsomolskaya Pravda about Zabirova
 "Olympic Champion Zulfiya Zabirova"
 "Russian olympicist began to emigrate," article in the newspaper Utro.ru about Zabirova's plans to move to Kazakhstan

1973 births
Living people
Kazakhstani female cyclists
Uzbekistani female cyclists
Russian female cyclists
Olympic cyclists of Russia
Olympic cyclists of Kazakhstan
Olympic gold medalists for Russia
Cyclists at the 1996 Summer Olympics
Cyclists at the 2000 Summer Olympics
Cyclists at the 2004 Summer Olympics
Cyclists at the 2008 Summer Olympics
Sportspeople from Tashkent
Olympic medalists in cycling
Asian Games medalists in cycling
Cyclists at the 2006 Asian Games
UCI Road World Champions (women)
Medalists at the 1996 Summer Olympics
Asian Games silver medalists for Kazakhstan
Medalists at the 2006 Asian Games